Zhang Yalin (19 April 1981 – 14 February 2010) was a Chinese football midfielder.

Biography
Zhang Yalin started his football career in the 2000 Chinese league season for Dalian Shide F.C. and would quickly establish himself within the team that won the league title. From then on he would become a vital member of the team and by 2003 he was selected to the China national under-23 football team but was injured in training, which ruled him out from any tournament. By 2006 in his personal life he married Jia Nini (贾妮妮), a Chinese model and actress. They named their daughter, who was born 12 July 2007, Zhang Shijia (张诗伽).

On 14 February 2010, Zhang died of lymphoma in Dalian, aged 28, after two years with the disease.

Since his death, his shirt number of 26 has been retired in his honour by Dalian Shide.

Honours

Club
Chinese Super League
 Winners (1): 2005
Chinese Jia-A League
 Winners (3): 2000, 2001, 2002
Chinese Super Cup
 Winners (2): 2000, 2002
Chinese FA Cup
 Winners (2): 2001, 2005
Asian Cup Winners' Cup
 Runners-up (1): 2001

References

External links
 Profile in Football-Lineups.com
 Sina.com news about Zhang Yalin

1981 births
2010 deaths
Chinese footballers
Footballers from Dalian
Dalian Shide F.C. players
Deaths from lymphoma
Deaths from cancer in the People's Republic of China
Association football midfielders